Jacob Miltz (born 14 February 2000) is a South African cricketer. He made his first-class debut on 16 January 2020, for Gauteng in the 2019–20 CSA 3-Day Provincial Cup. Prior to his first-class debut, he had played for South Africa's U19 cricket team.

References

External links
 

2000 births
Living people
South African cricketers
Gauteng cricketers
Place of birth missing (living people)